An indirect presidential election was held in Greece on 3 February 2010. Incumbent President Karolos Papoulias was nominated by the ruling PASOK party (160 seats) and secured the support of the main opposition party, New Democracy (91 seats), as well as that of the smaller LAOS (15 seats). Papoulias stood unopposed and was elected on the first ballot, with 266 votes.

References

2010
2010 elections in Greece
2010 in Greek politics